Airport Thana is a police station of Barisal City and also with some part of Barisal Sadar Upazila and Babuganj Upazila.

Administration

Barisal City

1.  Ward No. 27

2. Ward No. 28

3. Ward No. 29

4. Ward No. 30

Barisal Sadar Upazila

1. 01 No. Raipasha-Karapur Union

2. 02 No. Kashipur Union

Babuganj Upazila

1. 04 No. Chandpasha Union

2. 05 No. Rahmatpur Union

3. 06 No. Madhobpasha Union

History
Airport Thana was created in June 2010.

References

Thanas of Barisal